Brian (sometimes spelled Bryan in English) is a male given name of Irish and Breton origin, as well as a surname of Occitan origin. It is common in the English-speaking world.

It is possible that the name is derived from an Old Celtic word meaning "high" or "noble". For example, the element bre means "hill"; which could be transferred to mean "eminence" or "exalted one". The name is quite popular in Ireland, on account of Brian Boru, a 10th-century High King of Ireland. The name was also quite popular in East Anglia during the Middle Ages. This is because the name was introduced to England by Bretons following the Norman Conquest. Bretons also settled in Ireland along with the Normans in the 12th century, and 'their' name was mingled with the 'Irish' version. Also, in the north-west of England, the 'Irish' name was introduced by Scandinavian settlers from Ireland. Within the Gaelic speaking areas of Scotland, the name was at first only used by professional families of Irish origin.

It was the fourth most popular male name in England and Wales in 1934, but a sharp decline followed over the remainder of the 20th century and by 1994 it had fallen out of the top 100. It retained its popularity in the United States for longer; its most popular period there was from 1968 to 1979 when it consistently ranked between eighth and tenth. The name has become increasingly popular in South America, particularly Argentina and Uruguay, since the early 1990s.

The surname Brian is sometimes an English and Irish variant spelling of the surname Bryan. The English and French surname Brian is sometimes derived from the personal Celtic personal name shown above. The surname Brian can also sometimes be a French surname; derived from the Old Occitan word brian, meaning "maggot" and used as a nickname.

Variants of the name include Briant, Brien, Bran, Brion, Bryan, Bryant, Brjánn (in Icelandic) and Bryon. Variant spellings such as "Brien" are sometimes used as female given names, especially among members of the Irish diaspora. 

In Latin America, the phonetic spelling “Brayan” is often used, associated with working-class parents aspiring to a higher socioeconomic status associated with Anglo-American culture, and mocked for that reason on social media.

Notable people with the name

Mononyms
Brian (dog), original name of Bing, a dog who served in the British Army in World War II
Brian (mythology), Celtic mythological figure
 Brian, a snail character in the children's television programme The Magic Roundabout

Surname
Denis Brian (1923–2017), British journalist and writer
Donald Brian (1877–1948), Canadian-American actor, dancer, and singer
Havergal Brian (1876–1972), British classical composer
Mary Brian (1906–2002), American actress and movie star
Morgan Brian (born 1993), American women's soccer player

Given name: common combinations

Brian Allen
Brian Andersen
Brian Anderson
Brian Becker
Brian Bell
Brian Bennett
Brian Blake
Brian Bowman
Brian Briggs
Brian Brown
Brian Burns
Brian Byrne
Brian Campbell
Brian Carroll
Brian Clark
Brian Clarke
Brian Cole
Brian Coleman
Brian Collins
Brian Cook
Brian Cox
Brian Cummings
Brian Cunningham
Brian Davis
Brian Dixon
Brian Doyle
Brian Edwards
Brian Fallon
Brian Fitzpatrick
Brian Fletcher
Brian Flynn
Brian Francis
Brian Freeman
Brian Gibson
Brian Grant
Brian Green
Brian Hall
Brian Harvey
Brian Henderson
Brian Higgins
Brian Hill
Brian Hogan
Brian James
Brian Johnson
Brian Johnston
Brian Jones
Brian Keith
Brian Kelly
Brian Kennedy
Brian Kim
Brian Lee
Brian Lewis
Brian MacMahon
Brian Magee
Brian Marshall
Brian Martin
Brian Mason
Brian McBride
Brian McFadden
Brian McLean
Brian Miller
Brian Moore
Brian Moran
Brian Mullins
Brian Murphy
Brian O'Halloran
Brian O'Neill
Brian O'Sullivan
Brian Plummer
Brian Reynolds
Brian Roberts
Brian Robertson
Brian Savage
Brian Schmidt
Brian Scott
Brian Shaw
Brian Simmons
Brian Smith
Brian Smyth
Brian Stack
Brian Stafford
Brian Stewart
Brian Sullivan
Brian Thompson
Brian Thomson
Brian Tucker
Brian Turner
Brian Tyler
Brian Walsh
Brian White
Brian Williams
Brian Wilson
Brian Wong
Brian Wood
Brian Wright

Given name: individuals 
Brian Ah Yat (born 1975), American football player
Brian Alderson (1950–1997), Scottish footballer
Brian Aldiss (1925–2017), British author
Brian Asamoah (born 2000), American football player
Brian Austin Green (born 1973), American actor and rapper
Brian Bannister (born 1981), American baseball player and coach
Brian Bass (born 1982), American former professional baseball player
Brian Blessed (born 1937), English actor
Brian Boitano (born 1963), American figure skater
Brian Bollinger (born 1968), American football player
Brian Bonsall (born 1981), American rock musician, singer, guitarist and former child actor
Brian Boru (941–1014), Irish king who overthrew the centuries-long domination of the Kingship of Ireland by the Uí Néill
Brian Broomell (born 1958), American football player
Brian Clough (1935–2004), British football manager
Brian Cornell, American businessman
Brian Cowen (born 1960), former Taoiseach (Prime Minister) of the Republic of Ireland
Brian de la Puente (born 1985), NFL football player
Brian Dabul (born 1984), Argentinian tennis player
Brian De Palma (born 1940), American film director
Brian Deneke (1978–1997), American teenage punk musician
Brian Dennehy (1938-2020), American actor
Brian Dowling (born 1978), Irish television presenter
Brian Eno (born 1948), English electronic musician, music theorist and record producer
Brian Epstein (1934–1967), English businessperson, manager of The Beatles
Brian Folkerts (born 1990), American football player
Brian Gaine, American football executive
Brian Ginsberg (born 1966), American former gymnast
Brian Gottfried (born 1952), American tennis player
Brian Gowins (born 1976), American football player
Brian Grazer (born 1951), American Oscar-winning film and television producer
Brian Gutekunst (born 1973), American football executive
Brian Haley (born 1961), American actor and comedian
Brian Heidik (born 1968), American actor, used car salesman, and television personality
Brian Horwitz (nicknamed "The Rabbi"; born 1982), American major league baseball outfielder
Brian Hutton, Baron Hutton (1932–2020), British law lord and barrister
Brian Joo (born 1981), American-born Korean singer, former member of the R&B duo Fly to the Sky
Brian Jossie (born 1977), American professional wrestler performing under the ring name of Abraham Washington
Brian Joubert (born 1984), French figure skater and 2007 World Champion
Brian Lara (born 1969), former West Indian cricketer
Brian Laudrup (born 1969), former Danish international soccer player
Brian Laundrie, American fugitive
Brian Lewerke (born 1996), American football player
Brian Limond (born 1974), Scottish comedian
Brian Littrell (born 1975), member of the boy band, The Backstreet Boys
Brian May (born 1947), guitarist, songwriter, founding member of the band Queen
Brian McConaghy (born 1950), Canadian forensic scientist
Brian McKnight (born 1969) American singer-songwriter, arranger, producer, and R&B musician
 Brian David Mitchell (born 1953), American criminal convicted of the Kidnapping of Elizabeth Smart
Brian Molko (born 1972), lead vocalist of the band Placebo
Brian Moorman (born 1976), American football player for the Buffalo Bills
Brian Mulroney (born 1939), former Canadian prime minister (1984–1993)
Brian O'Driscoll (born 1979), Irish rugby player
Brian O'Keefe (born 1956), Australian rules footballer
Brian O'Keefe (baseball), American baseball player
Brian O'Keeffe, Irish hurler
Brian Orser (born 1961), Canadian figure skater
Brian Paddick (born 1958), British politician
Brian Peaker (born 1959), Canadian rower
Brian Peets (born 1956), American football player
Brian Piccolo (1943–1970), American football player for the Chicago Bears and subject of TV movie Brian's Song
Brian Randle, American basketball player
Brian Ransom (gridiron football) (born 1960), American player of gridiron football
Brian Retterer (born 1972), American swimmer
Brian Ross (journalist) (born 1948), American investigative correspondent for ABC News
Brian Savoy (born 1992), Swiss basketball player
Brian Schneider (born 1976), American baseball player
Brian Serven (born 1995), American baseball player
Brian Sims (born 1978), American politician, member of the Pennsylvania House of Representatives
Brian Snitker (born 1955), American baseball coach
Brian Stelter (born 1985), American journalist and television news correspondent
Brian Stephney (born 1983), Montserratian cricketer
Brian Sweeney (born 1974), American baseball player and coach
Brian Sweeney (sailor), Canadian sailor
Brian Teacher (born 1952), American tennis player
Brian Tucker (screenwriter), American film screenwriter
Brian Tyler (born 1972), American composer and musician
Brian Urlacher (born 1978), American football player for the Chicago Bears
Brian Viloria (born 1980), American boxer
Brian Warner (born 1969), American singer, better known by his stage name Marilyn Manson
Brian Wecht (born 1975), composer/producer of musical comedy duo, Ninja Sex Party
Brian Westbrook (born 1979), American football player for the Philadelphia Eagles
Brian Williams (born 1959), anchor and managing editor of NBC Nightly News on the NBC Television Network

Fictional characters
 Brian Griffin on Family Guy, voiced by Seth MacFarlane
 Brian Kinney on Queer as Folk (US), played by Gale Harold
 Brian O'Conner in The Fast and the Furious series, played by Paul Walker
 Brian Cohen, main protagonist of Monty Python's Life of Brian, played by Graham Chapman
 Brian Green, from the British TV show Torchwood
 Brian Johnson, main character in the 1985 film The Breakfast Club
 Brian Doheny (commonly referred to as BrianD), main protagonist of Video Game High School

Media titles
Films and television shows which contain the name Brian include:
 Brian's Song (1971, 2001)
 Monty Python's Life of Brian (1979)
 What About Brian, American TV series that began in 2006
 Burying Brian, mini New Zealand TV series

See also
 Brian (disambiguation)
 Brien
 Bryan (given name)
 Bryan (surname)
 Brayan, a masculine given name
 List of Irish-language given names
 O'Brian, surname
 O'Brien (surname)

References

English-language masculine given names
Irish-language masculine given names
English masculine given names
Surnames of Irish origin
French-language surnames